Sgibeyevo is a rural locality (a station) in Rabochy Posylok Urusha of Skovorodinsky District, Amur Oblast, Russia. The population was 2 as of 2018. There is 1 street.

Geography 
Sgibeyevo is located 106 km west of Skovorodino (the district's administrative centre) by road. Urusha is the nearest rural locality.

References 

Rural localities in Skovorodinsky District